Zapteryx is a genus of fish in the Rhinobatidae family found in coastal parts of the Americas.

Species

 †Zapteryx bichuti Signeux, 1961

 Zapteryx brevirostris J. P. Müller & Henle, 1841 (Shortnose guitarfish)
 Zapteryx exasperata D. S. Jordan & C. H. Gilbert, 1880 (Banded guitarfish)
 Zapteryx xyster D. S. Jordan & Evermann, 1896 (Southern banded guitarfish)

References

 
Trygonorrhinidae
Ray genera
Taxa named by David Starr Jordan
Taxa named by Charles Henry Gilbert
Taxonomy articles created by Polbot